Afton Township may refer to the following townships in the United States:

Arkansas
 Afton Township, Fulton County, Arkansas

Illinois
 Afton Township, DeKalb County, Illinois

Iowa
 Afton Township, Cherokee County, Iowa
 Afton Township, Howard County, Iowa

Kansas
 Afton Township, Sedgwick County, Kansas

North Dakota
 Afton Township, Ward County, North Dakota

South Dakota
 Afton Township, Brookings County, South Dakota
 Afton Township, Sanborn County, South Dakota

Township name disambiguation pages